Defend ID or Defense Industry Indonesia is an Indonesian defense industry holding consisting of PT Pindad, PT Dirgantara Indonesia, PT PAL Indonesia, PT Dahana, and PT Len Industri as the parent of the holding. Under Defend ID, PT Pindad will focus on ground-based platform, PT Dirgantara Indonesia will focus on airborne platforms, PT PAL Indonesia will focus on naval platforms, while PT Dahana will focus on development of explosives for all defense units. 

The company is launched by President Joko Widodo on 20 April 2022.

Jokowi stated that the goal of the company is to join world's top 50 defense companies by 2024, and to increase the use of locally manufactured components in Indonesia's defense industry.

See also 

 State-owned enterprises of Indonesia
 Pindad
 PT PAL Indonesia
PT Dirgantara Indonesia

References

External links 
 website

Government-owned companies of Indonesia
Companies based in Bandung
Firearm manufacturers of Indonesia
Holding companies